Pleurobrachiidae is a family of ctenophores belonging to the order Cydippida.

Genera:
 Hormiphora  L.Agassiz, 1860
 Minictena  C.Carré & D.Carré, 1993
 Moseria  Ghigi, 1909
 Pleurobrachia  Fleming, 1822
 Sabaudia  Ghigi, 1909
 Tinerfe  Chun, 1898

References

Animal families
 
Tentaculata